Aran o Bidgol (also Romanized as Ārān va Bīdgol and Ārān-o-Bīd Gol, meaning "Aran and Bidgol") is a city and capital of Aran va Bidgol County, Isfahan Province, Iran.  At the 2006 census, its population was 55,651, in 15,556 families.  It is one of the ancient desert cities of the province, close to Kashan (around 5 km).

As suggested by its name, the city is an amalgam of two formerly separate settlements: Aran (Persian: , also Romanized as Ārān and Arūn) and Bidgol.

History
The area originally consisted of two distinct and separate villages named “Aran” and “Bidgol”. Each village had its own customs, social communications, and dialect. It was situated near the Silk Road and many caravans passed it on their way from Europe to the Orient.

About 40 years ago, the wall of separation collapsed and these two small towns unified.
We can name the Jandaghian family as one of the most famous ones in this city. Jandaghians have a representative in the Ministry of interiors.

Geography and industry
The town is surrounded by desert from the north and east, and thus it has a typical climate of hot and dry in summer, cold and dry in winter, and very little rainfall during the year. These conditions make agriculture difficult.

Carpet weaving is one of the major industrial products of this city and its carpets are exported to Afghanistan, Pakistan, Iraq and other neighboring countries. Recently, sources of natural gas and oil have been discovered near the city.
Unfortunately, due to the unauthorized and illegal use of underground water tables by companies such as Foulad and Zob, this city has suffered a severe water shortage crisis, and as a result, we are witnessing severe land subsidence.

Tourist attractions
Deserts and salt lakes tours
Camel riding in desert
Driving on sand dunes
Maranjab Caravansarai
Si zan castle
Holy shrines and religious mausoleums (belonging to the offspring of the prophet Muhammad).

Gallery

See also

Kashan
Isfahan Province
Iranian history

References

External links

 ĀRĀN, Encyclopædia Iranica
http://www.persiadesert.com

Populated places in Aran va Bidgol County
Cities in Isfahan Province